were members of the samurai class of feudal Japan. Yoriki literally means helper or assistant.

Description and history
Yoriki assisted daimyō (feudal lords) or their designated commanders during military campaigns in the Kamakura and Muromachi periods. In the Edo period, yoriki provided administrative assistance at governmental offices. Among different yorikis were the machikata yoriki, who were in charge of police under the command of the machi-bugyō. Below the yoriki were the dōshin. In the city of Edo there were about 25 yorikis working each for the two machi-bugyō offices.

References

 Cunningham, Don (2004). 'Taiho-Jutsu: Law and Order in the Age of the Samurai'. Tuttle Publishing. p. 43. . Google Book Search. Retrieved on February 26, 2009.

Officials of the Tokugawa shogunate
Government of feudal Japan